This is a list of notable individuals associated with the creation of a diet food or fad diet.

List

References 

Diets
Fad diets
Food- and drink-related lists
Health-related lists